Rodeløkka is a neighborhood in Grünerløkka in Oslo, Norway.

From 1900 to 1961, it was served by the Rodeløkka Line of the Oslo Tramway.

The name
The property was bought by the dean Frederik Rode in 1854. The last element is the finite form of løkke f 'paddock'.

References

External links
Ekte gategutter fra Rodeløkka [Real boys-of-the-streets from Rodeløkka]. 26 December 2020. Dagsavisen

Neighbourhoods of Oslo